The Island X-199 Spectra was a prototype technology demonstrator designed to test several concepts in amphibian aircraft design in anticipation of a future production variant. Originally known as the "Spectra", it later was renamed for marketing purposes, the "X-199".

Design and development
The two-seat Spectra featured a unique configuration in mounting its piston engine in a nacelle on the vertical T-tail. This engineering decision led to less drag compared to a separate pylon and nacelle as well moving the engine and propeller above the spray generated in water operation. The streamlined fuselage design also incorporated a retractable hull step that dramatically reduced the drag penalties of contemporary amphibian designs. 

Designed for simplicity of construction and modification, the Spectra had Vultee BT-13 outer wing panels with unique dropping wing tips that also acted as stabilizing floats. Construction included all-metal control surfaces, aluminum bulkheads as well as the tail assembly utilizing Spruce spars and wooden ribs and a tubular steel engine mount.  

Island Aircraft Corporation first utilized a 1/6th scale radio controlled engineering test model. The fully proportional ailerons, rudder, elevator, throttle and flap controls closely correspond to the full scale vehicle. Over 20 flights were made with the scale model.

After extensive taxi tests, the sole Spectra prototype, registered as N9168, made its maiden flight in 1969. The technology demonstrator was intended to be the pattern aircraft for a future larger, and more powerful (300 hp Lycoming O-540 engine), four-seat production variant, the Spectra IV, planned for introduction in 1972.  The definitive production variant would have a tricycle landing gear with the main units retracting into the wings while the nose gear would retract forward to act as a bumper for beaching and docking operations.

Operational history
The Spectra prototype flew as a flying boat and did not have true amphibian capability. Despite receiving favourable notices from aviation professionals and garnering enthusiastic media reviews, Island Aircraft Corporation was not able to elicit further interest from investors and did not secure any serious market ventures to proceed with production plans. The sole Spectra built had its Flight Certificate revoked in 1977, and now sits derelict at the former Island Aircraft hangar in Merritt Island, Florida.

Variants
Spectra 2
 1/6th scale radio controlled engineering test model
Spectra X-199
The two-seat prototype for the series; not configured for amphibian use
Spectra IV
Enlarged four-seat variant, using a more powerful 300 hp engine; intended for production but never built.

Specifications (Spectra X-199)

See also

References

Notes

Citations

Bibliography

 Johnson, E.R. American Flying Boats and Amphibious Aircraft: An Illustrated History. Jefferson, North Carolina: McFarland & Co., 2009. .
 Levy, Howard. "New concept in amphibians." Air Progress, Volume 26, Number 4, April 1970.
 Taylor, John W. R., ed. Jane's All the World's Aircraft, 1970-71. New York: McGraw Hill, 1970. .

External links
 Aircraft N9168 photo
 Island at Aerofiles
 "Roy LoPresti's Spectra Aircraft - New design for amphibious aircraft": Video of Spectra tests

Flying boats
Light-sport aircraft
1960s United States experimental aircraft
Single-engined tractor aircraft
Low-wing aircraft
Aircraft first flown in 1969
Hydrofoil aircraft